The 2020 BWF season was the overall badminton circuit organized by the Badminton World Federation (BWF) for the 2020 badminton season to publish and promote the sport. The world badminton tournament in 2020 consisted of:
1. BWF World Tour (Grade 2)
 Level 1 (BWF World Tour Finals)
 Level 2 (BWF World Tour Super 1000)
 Level 3 (BWF World Tour Super 750)
 Level 4 (BWF World Tour Super 500)
 Level 5 (BWF World Tour Super 300)
 Level 6 (BWF Tour Super 100)

2. Continental Circuit (Grade 3) BWF Open Tournaments: BWF International Challenge, BWF International Series, and BWF Future Series.

The tournaments – Super 1000, Super 750, Super 500, Super 300, Super 100, International Challenge, International Series, and Future Series were all individual tournaments. The higher the level of tournament, the larger the prize money and the more ranking points available.

The 2020 BWF season calendar comprised these six levels of BWF tournaments.

Schedule 
This is the complete schedule of events on the 2020 calendar, with the champions and runners-up documented.
Key

January

February

March

April

May

June

July

August

September

October

November

December

January 2021

Retirements 
Following is a list of notable players (winners of a main tour title, and/or part of the BWF Rankings top 100 for at least one week) who announced their retirement from professional badminton, during the 2020 season:
  Mathias Boe (born 11 July 1980 in Frederikssund, Denmark) reached a career high of no. 1 in the men's doubles on 11 November 2010. He was the gold medalist at the 2015 European Games, two time European champions winning in 2012 and 2017, and the silver medalist at the 2012 Summer Olympics. He was part of Denmark winning team at the 2016 Thomas Cup, European Mixed Team Championships in 2015 and 2017, and also seven European Men's Team Championships from 2006 to 2020. Boe has collected 3 World Tour title, 16 Superseries title, 12 Grand Prix title, and 14 Continental circuit title. Badminton Denmark announced his retirement on 23 April 2020. The 2020 All England Open was his last tournament.
  Tontowi Ahmad (born 18 July 1987 in Banyumas, Central Java, Indonesia) reached a career high of no. 1 in the mixed doubles on 3 May 2018. He won gold medals at the 2016 Rio Olympics; World Championships in 2013 and 2017; Asian Championships in 2015; and also 30 titles in BWF sanctioned tournaments, with three consecutive All England Open titles from 2012 to 2014. After spent 15-years of badminton career, he announced his retirement through social media account Instagram on 18 May 2020. The 2020 Indonesia Masters was his last tournament.
  Mads Conrad-Petersen (born 12 January 1988 in Brørup, Vejen, Denmark) reached a career high of no. 4 in the men's doubles on 14 May 2018. He was the 2007 European Junior and 2016 European champion. He was part of Denmark winning team at the 2016 Thomas Cup, European Mixed Team Championships in 2015 and 2017, and also 5 European Men's Team Championships from 2012 to 2020. He has collected 13 individual BWF circuit title. Conrad-Petersen retired from the international badminton on 20 May 2020, where he previously absent from the international tournament from November 2018 to March 2019. The 2020 All England Open was his last tournament.
  Chau Hoi Wah (born 5 June 1986 in Hong Kong) reached a career high of no. 6 in the mixed doubles on 16 June 2014. She won the 2014 Asian Championships, became the first ever Hong Kong player to win that title. She also won a bronze medal at the 2017 World Championships, in addition to 7 international individual titles. She spent 15 years in Hong Kong team, and announced her retirement on her 34th birthday (5 June 2020). She then returned to Toronto, Canada, joining her family, and starting a new career as a coach in a local club. The 2019 Macau Open was her last tournament.
  Lin Dan (born 14 October 1983 in Longyan, Fujian, China) reached a career high of no. 1 in the men's singles on 26 February 2004. Having won 66 individual titles, including 2 gold medals at the Olympic Games, 5 golds at the World Championships, 2 golds at the World Cup, 2 golds at the Asian Games and 4 golds at the Asian Championships; and also in the team event won 5 Sudirman Cup, 6 Thomas Cup, and 3 Asian Games titles. After spent 20 years in the competitive international tournaments, he announced his retirement on social media on 4 July 2020. The 2020 All England Open was his last tournament.
  Carsten Mogensen (born 24 July 1983 in Roskilde, Denmark) reached a career high of no. 1 in the men's doubles on 11 November 2010. He was the gold medalist at the 2015 European Games, two time European champions winning in 2012 and 2017, and the silver medalist at the 2012 Summer Olympics. He was part of Denmark winning team at the European Mixed Team Championships in 2015 and 2017, and also seven European Men's Team Championships from 2006 to 2020. Mogensen has collected 35 individual BWF circuit title, including three Superseries Finals title. Badminton Denmark reported his retirement from the national team on 7 July 2020. The 2020 Spain Masters was his last international tournament.
  Jelle Maas (born 19 February 1991 in Oosterhout, Netherlands) reached a career high of no. 26 in the men's doubles and no. 44 in the mixed doubles. He won the men's doubles bronze medals at the 2018 European Championships and at the 2019 European Games, in addition to another 4 BWF sanctioned international titles. Badminton Nederland announced his retirement from the international tours on 22 July 2020, and officially left the national training center on 1 September 2020. The 2020 All England Open was his last tournament.
  Ayaka Takahashi (born 19 April 1990 in Kashihara, Nara, Japan) reached a career high of no. 1 in the women's doubles on 20 October 2014. She won a gold medal at the 2016 Rio Olympics, won the world women's team championships (Uber Cup) in 2018, two times Asian Champions in 2016 and 2017, in addition to another 27 international titles, including the year-end tournament finals in 2014 and 2018; and the historical tournament All England Open in 2016. She announced her retirement in an online conference on 19 August 2020, and officially left the national team on 30 August. The 2020 All England Open was her last tournament.
  Jan Ø. Jørgensen (born 31 December 1987 in Svenstrup, Aalborg Municipality, Denmark) reached a career high of no. 2 in the men's singles on 22 January 2015. He won the title at the 2014 European Championships, and a bronze medal at the 2015 World Championships. He was part of Denmark winning team at the 2016 Thomas Cup, four European Mixed Team Championships, and seven European Men's Team Championships. He also won 10 BWF International title including a Superseries Premier event in Indonesia and China. He retired from international events after a quarter-final defeat in the 2020 Denmark Open on 16 October 2020.
  Emma Karlsson (born 16 May 1998 in Älmhult, Sweden) reached a career high of no. 37 in the women's doubles on 10 September 2019. She won the girls' doubles title at the 2017 European Junior Championships. She also won three senior international title. Badminton Europe reported her retirement on 14 November 2020. The 2020 All England Open was her last tournament.

Reference

External links
 Badminton World Federation (BWF) at www.bwfbadminton.org

2020 in badminton
Badminton World Federation seasons